Douglas W. Currie (born 25 June 1961) is a Canadian politician who represented the electoral district of Charlottetown-Parkdale in the Legislative Assembly of Prince Edward Island as a member of the Liberal Party from 2007 until his resignation in 2017.

Background

Born in Charlottetown, Prince Edward Island, Currie grew up in District 11 Charlottetown-Parkdale where he currently lives with his two daughters. He holds a BA and BEd degree from the University of Prince Edward Island and a M.Ed. from the University of New Brunswick. Currie was a school teacher and principal of Birchwood Intermediate School. He served as Head Coach and Director of Hockey Operations for the University of Prince Edward Island.

Political career

In May 2007, Currie served as Minister of Health, Social Services and Seniors. He represented Provincial and Territorial Ministries of Health in 2008 as part of the Canadian delegation to the World Health Organization Forum in Geneva, Switzerland. As Health Minister Currie helped establish the Integrated Health System Project, which focused on operational improvements and service realignment to improve health services for Islanders. The government's vision of One Island Future – One Island Health System guided this project.

From January 2010 to Fall 2011 Currie served as Minister of Education and Early Childhood Development and Attorney General. During this time, Currie implemented the Public Education Governance Review for the Province of Prince Edward Island and was the driving force behind several key changes to Prince Edward Island's education system.

In October 2011, Currie was appointed Minister of Health and Wellness and Minister Responsible for Sport and Recreation. Currie led the renewal and implementation of the Mental Health and Addictions Strategy, the creation of Health PEI, and the transformation of the provincial health care system.

In February 2015, Currie was appointed Minister of Health and Wellness, Minister Responsible for Sport and Recreation and Minister Responsible for Municipal Affairs. In May 2015, he was appointed Minister of Health and Wellness, Minister Responsible for Sport and Recreation and Minister of Family and Human Services.

On January 7, 2016, Currie was appointed Minister of Education, Early Learning and Culture. He resigned from the legislature on October 19, 2017.

On January 22, 2021, Currie was acclaimed as candidate for the Conservative Party in the riding of Charlottetown.

Electoral record

Federal elections

Provincial elections

References
 Biography at Legislative Assembly of Prince Edward Island website

1961 births
Living people
Conservative Party of Canada candidates for the Canadian House of Commons
People from Charlottetown
Prince Edward Island Liberal Party MLAs
Members of the Executive Council of Prince Edward Island
University of Prince Edward Island alumni
University of New Brunswick alumni
21st-century Canadian politicians